The 2013 International GTSprint Series season was the fourth year of the International GTSprint Series. The season began at Monza on 6 April and finished at Vallelunga on 13 October. Thomas Schöffler won the championship, driving an Audi.

Teams and drivers

Calendar and results

Championship Standings

Drivers' championship

† - Drivers did not finish the race, but were classified as they completed over 50% of the race distance.

External links
Official Superstars website

International GTSprint Series
Superstars Series seasons